At Risk is a 1994 American romantic drama film directed by and starring Elana Krausz. The film also stars Kim Meyers, Daniel McDonald, and Vince Vaughn. The film is about a woman named Lara, after spending a year in Mexico unsuccessfully trying to save her marriage to Steven, returns to the United States to find Max, her lover in this AIDS cautionary tale.

Cast
Elana K. Pyle (aka Elana Krausz) as Lara Wade
Daniel McDonald as Steven Wade 
Kim Meyers as Jennifer Rich
Vince Vaughn as Max Nolan
Shirley Anne Field as Mrs. Nolan
Randy Travis as Ellison
Matthew Flint as Mark

References

External links 
 
 
 At Risk (1994) at Yahoo! Movies

1994 films
1994 romantic drama films
American independent films
American romantic drama films
1994 independent films
1990s English-language films
1990s American films